Ahmed Ali Abdelrahman  (born 26 January 1984) is an Egyptian handball player for Al Ahly and the Egyptian national team.

References

1984 births
Living people
Egyptian male handball players
Place of birth missing (living people)
Competitors at the 2013 Mediterranean Games
Mediterranean Games gold medalists for Egypt
Mediterranean Games medalists in handball
21st-century Egyptian people